A King in New York is a 1957 British comedy film directed by and starring Charlie Chaplin in his last leading role, which co-stars, among others, his young son Michael. The film presents a satirical view of the McCarthy communist-hunt era and certain other aspects of United States politics and society. The film, which was produced in Europe after Chaplin's exile from the U.S. in 1952, did not open in the United States until 1972. For this reason, the movie was presented on the island of Ischia, in Italy.

Plot
"One of the minor annoyances in modern life is a revolution." Deposed by revolution in his home country of Estrovia, King Igor Shahdov (Charlie Chaplin) comes to New York City almost broke, his securities having been stolen by his own Prime Minister. He tries to contact the Atomic Energy Commission with his ideas for using atomic power to create a utopia.

At a dinner party, some of which is televised live (unbeknown to him), Shahdov reveals he has had some experience in the theatre. He's approached to do TV commercials but does not like the idea. Later, he does make a few commercials in order to get some money.

Invited to speak at a progressive school, Shahdov meets Rupert Macabee (Michael Chaplin), a ten-year-old historian and editor of the school paper who doesn't want to disclose his political affinity due to fear of McCarthyism.  Macabee proceeds to give Shahdov a stern Marxist lecture. Although Rupert himself says he distrusts all forms of government, his parents are Communists who are jailed for not giving up names at a Joseph McCarthy-type hearing. Because young Rupert had spent time with him, Shahdov is suspected of being a Communist himself, and has to face one of the hearings. He is cleared of all charges, but not before a scene in which Shahdov accidentally directs a strong stream of water from a fire hose at the members of the "House Committee on Un-American Activities" (HUAC), who scatter in panic. He decides to join his estranged queen in Paris for a reconciliation.

In the meantime, the authorities force the child to reveal the names of his parents' friends in exchange for his parents' freedom. Grieving and guilt-ridden, Rupert is presented to King Shahdov as a "patriot". Shahdov reassures him that the anti-Communist scare is a lot of nonsense which will be over soon and invites him to come to Europe with his parents for a visit.

In addition to its condemnation of HUAC's methods, the film takes witty potshots at American commercialism, popular music, celebrity culture, and film. A dinner party scene includes a number of satirical portrayals of actors and public figures of the period, including Sophie Tucker.

Cast
 Charlie Chaplin as King Shahdov
 Maxine Audley as Queen Irene
 Jerry Desmonde as Prime Minister Voudel
 Oliver Johnston as Ambassador Jaume
 Dawn Addams as Ann Kay - TV Specialist
 Sid James as Johnson - TV Advertiser (billed as Sidney James)
 Joan Ingram as Mona Cromwell - Hostess
 Michael Chaplin as Rupert Macabee
 John McLaren as Macabee Senior
 Phil Brown as Headmaster
 Harry Green as Lawyer
 Robert Arden as Liftboy
 Alan Gifford as School Superintendent
 Robert Cawdron as U.S. Marshal
 George Woodbridge, Clifford Buckton, and Vincent Lawson as Members of Atomic Commission
 Shani Wallis as Cabaret Singer
 Joy Nichols
 Lauri Lupino Lane
 George Truzzi
 Frazer Hines (uncredited)

Reception
The film did well in Europe, but its lack of U.S. distribution severely hampered its commercial impact. The film divides opinion over its merits. Variety called it a "tepid disappointment" and a "half-hearted comedy with sour political undertones" with some "spasmodically funny scenes". The film ranked 1st on Cahiers du Cinéma's Top 10 Films of the Year List in 1957. The film has a "fresh" rating of 80% on the review aggregator website  Rotten Tomatoes, based on 10 reviews.

Chaplin biographer Jeffrey Vance, writing in 2003, believes A King in New York to be an important film within Chaplin's body of work. He concludes his lengthy examination of the film with the statement, "Although A King in New York targets the social and political climate of the 1950s, its satiric commentary is timeless. Despite its flaws, the film remains a fascinating study of life in America through the eyes of its most famous exile".

The film was eventually released in the United States in March 1972, opening at the Little Art theatre in Yellow Springs, Ohio. It was then shown at UCLA in November 1973 and then opened at the Playboy theatre in New York on December 19, 1973.

References

External links
 
 
 

1957 films
1957 comedy films
British comedy films
British satirical films
British political satire films
British black-and-white films
British films set in New York City
Films directed by Charlie Chaplin
McCarthyism
1950s English-language films
1950s British films